Gastrotheca fissipes (common name: Igaracu marsupial frog) is a frog species in the frog family Hemiphractidae. It is endemic to eastern Brazil and known from the coastal lowlands of Pernambuco, Alagoas, Sergipe, and Bahia.

Gastrotheca fissipes occur in primary and secondary forests and on the forest edges. They are mainly associated with terrestrial and arboreal bromeliads.

Gastrotheca fissipes is a common species not considered threatened by the International Union for Conservation of Nature (IUCN). Major threat to it is habitat loss caused by agriculture, logging, collection of bromeliads, fire, and human settlement.

References

fissipes
Endemic fauna of Brazil
Amphibians of Brazil
Taxonomy articles created by Polbot
Amphibians described in 1888